Black Sands is the fourth studio album by English DJ Bonobo. It was released on 29 March 2010.

Artwork 

The cover features a photograph taken of Derwentwater, in northern England. The tower in the background is located in Castlerigg.

Track listing 
All tracks written and performed by Bonobo.

Personnel
Credits for Black Sands adapted from album liner notes.

Bonobo – piano (tracks 1 & 12), bass (tracks 3, 5, 6, 8, 9 & 10), upright bass (tracks 1, 11 & 12), guitars (tracks 3, 8, 9 & 11), classical guitar (tracks 5, 10 & 12), mandolin (track 12), keyboards (tracks 3, 8, 10 & 11), Fender Rhodes (tracks 5, 6 & 9), harmonium (tracks 1, 6 & 12), harp (track 4), xylophone (track 12), music box (track 10)
Andreya Triana – vocals (tracks 4, 9 & 10)
Mike Simmonds – violins (tracks 1, 2, 5 & 12), violas (track 5)
Mike Lesirge – flute (tracks 5 & 12), saxophone (track 5), clarinet (track 12)
Alan Hardiman – trombone (tracks 5 & 12)
Ryan Jacob – trumpet (tracks 5 & 12)
Jack Wyllie – saxophone (tracks 10)
Tom Chant – saxophone, bass clarinet (tracks 11)
Graham Fox – drums (track 11)
Jack Baker – drums (track 12)

Use in Media

"All In Forms", appeared in the film House at the End of the Street in 2012. Additionally, "Kong" can be heard during a scene in an artist's studio in the eighth episode of the second season of House of Cards, and Eyesdown can be heard in the background in the restaurant in the second episode of the third season of The Newsroom. The song "Black Sands" is the title-song of the French 2015-movie 'The Measure of a Man'. "Kiara" also appears in the video game Sleeping Dogs.

Awards

As of November 2016 it was certified silver by British Phonographic Industry for 60,000 sold units in UK. As of January 20, 2017 it has sold 72,756 copies in UK.

Certifications

References

External links 
 Bonobo's Official Website
 
Black Sands on SoundCloud
Black Sands on Spotify

Bonobo (musician) albums
2010 albums
Ninja Tune albums